African Writing Today is an anthology of postcolonial African literature, mostly short stories and a few poems, edited by South African writer, poet, and critic Es'kia Mphahlele. The anthology was published in London by Penguin in 1967.

Much of the literature in the anthology is from West and Southern Africa. Starting in the mid-1950s, international criticism of South Africa's apartheid regime brought more attention to race relations in the country, and as a result publishing opportunities for South African particularly in England increased; African Writing Today was one of a number of anthologies that proved an outlet for South African writers.

References

1967 anthologies
African poetry
African short stories